These are the results of the men's floor competition, one of eight events for male competitors in artistic gymnastics at the 1996 Summer Olympics in Atlanta. The qualification and final rounds took place on July 20, 22 and 28th at the Georgia Dome.

Results

Qualification

Ninety-three gymnasts competed in the floor event during the compulsory and optional rounds on July 20 and 22.  The eight highest scoring gymnasts advanced to the final on July 28.  Each country was limited to two competitors in the final.

Final

References
Official Olympic Report
www.gymnasticsresults.com

Men's Floor
Men's events at the 1996 Summer Olympics